Gordon Graham is the name of:

Gordon Graham (writer) (born 1955), Canadian writer
L. Gordon Graham (born 1949), British philosopher
 Gordon M. Graham (1918–2001), U.S. Air Force general